Donald  Conroy (April 4, 1921 – May 9, 1998) was a United States Marine Corps colonel and a member of the Black Sheep Squadron during the Korean War. He was also a veteran of World War II and served two tours of duty during the Vietnam War.  He is best known for being the inspiration for the character Lieutenant Colonel "Bull" Meecham in the novel The Great Santini, which was written by his son Pat Conroy.

Life and career
Conroy was originally from Chicago, and left Saint Ambrose College in Davenport, Iowa, to enlist in the Marines during World War II. He would later be commissioned an officer and become a pilot with VMF-214 when the Korean War began in June 1950. During the Cuban Missile Crisis, Conroy was part of an A-4 Skyhawk squadron at Marine Corps Air Station Beaufort. They were alerted and would quickly deploy to Roosevelt Roads Naval Station where they would remain for the duration of the crisis. He would also serve two tours in Vietnam during the Vietnam War.

He and his wife Peggy had seven children: Donald Patrick "Pat", Carol, Mike, Kathy, Jim, Tim, and Tom. Novelist Pat Conroy used his father as the inspiration for the fictitious character Marine Lt. Col. "Bull" Meecham in The Great Santini (spelled "Meechum" in the 1979 movie version starring Robert Duvall). Pat Conroy wrote another autobiographical book called My Losing Season, and as in The Great Santini, talks about how his father was very violent and abusive both towards him and his siblings. (The abuse took psychological form for all the children, and was additionally physical towards the male siblings.) Pat's sister Carol was institutionalized with mental illness, his brother, Tom, developed schizophrenia (and later committed suicide at age 33), and Pat himself also attempted suicide in 1975. Pat has indicated violent memories of his father haunt his every waking moment, a theme the author fictionalizes in his novel The Prince of Tides.

However, in later years, following his retirement from the Marines, Donald Conroy mended relationships with his children. In The Pat Conroy Cookbook, Pat Conroy provides numerous stories of his close relationship with his father during adulthood. He writes that in writing The Great Santini, his father aided him by supplying technical details about military fighter planes, and that this helped to improve their relationship. When the book was published,  Donald Conroy saw the character of Bull Meecham as a truthful tribute. Thereafter, he would accompany Pat to book signings, and would sign his son's books with the signature, "Donald Conroy – The Great Santini."

After retirement, Conroy moved to Atlanta, Georgia.  He died from colon cancer on May 9, 1998, and is interred at Beaufort National Cemetery, South Carolina. As Bull Meecham/Meechum is killed in the crash of his fighter in both the novel and movie versions of The Great Santini, and his funeral scene was filmed at the same cemetery for the movie, Conroy joked while planning his own funeral that it would be the second time he would be buried there.

Awards and decorations
His decorations and medals include:

See also

United States Marine Corps Aviation

References

External links
 Eulogy given by his son, Pat Conroy

1921 births
1998 deaths
United States Marine Corps officers
United States Naval Aviators
United States Marine Corps personnel of World War II
United States Marine Corps personnel of the Korean War
United States Marine Corps personnel of the Vietnam War
American Korean War pilots
Recipients of the Distinguished Flying Cross (United States)
Recipients of the Air Medal
Military personnel from Chicago
Burials at Beaufort National Cemetery
Aviators from Illinois